The South American U18 Championships in Athletics (Campeonato Sudamericano U18 de atletismo) is a biennial athletics event
organized by "Confederación Sudamericana de Atletismo" (CONSUDATLE), the South American area association of the International Amateur Athletic Federation (IAAF).  Starting in 1973, the competition was open for athletes under-17 in the early years. Since 2000 the international age group definition (under 18) has applied. Up until the 2016 edition the competition was known as the South American Youth Championships in Athletics. The tournament is open for athletes from CONSUDATLE member federations. Athletes from IAAF members of other geographical areas may be invited. 
However, they are not considered in the classification.

Events
Each member federation is allowed to enter 2 athletes and 1 relay team per event. 
Due to the latest edition of article 27 of the regulations of CONSUDATLE the following events are held during the championships:

Boys
 Dash: 100m, 200m, 400m, 800m, 1500m, 3000m
 Hurdling: 110m (height: 0.914 m), 400m (height: 0.84 m)
 Steeplechase: 2000m
 Relay: 1000m Medley relay (100m x 200m x 300m x 400m)
 Racewalking: 10,000m
 Throw: Shot put (5 kg), Discus (1.5 kg), Hammer (5 kg), Javelin (700 g)
 Jump: High Jump, Long Jump, Triple Jump, Pole Vault
 Combined: Octathlon (100m, Long jump, Shot put, 400m, 110m hurdles, High jump, Javelin, 1000m).

Girls
Starting in 2012, there were new implements for the throws (and consequently in heptathlon):

 Dash: 100m, 200m, 400m, 800m, 1500m, 3000m
 Hurdling: 100m (height: 0.762 m), 400m (height: 0.762 m)
 Steeplechase: 2000m
 Relay: 1000m Medley relay (100m x 200m x 300m x 400m)
 Racewalking: 5000m
 Throw: Shot put (3 kg; (until 2011: 4 kg)), Discus (1 kg), Hammer (3 kg; (until 2011: 4 kg)), Javelin (500 g; (until 2011: 600 g))
 Jump: High Jump, Long Jump, Triple Jump, Pole Vault
 Combined: Heptathlon (100m hurdles, High jump, Shot put, 200m, Long jump, Javelin, 800m).

Awards
Medals are awarded for individuals and relay team members for the first three
places in each event.

Trophies are awarded to teams in each category (male and female) with the
highest total number of cumulative points in the entire competition.
In addition, a trophy will be given to the country for the overall title.

A trophy is also presented to both a male and a female athlete for the most
outstanding performance.

Summary of championships

Medal table(1973-2021)

Records

Boys

Girls

Mixed events

Defunct events

Men

Women

References

External links
List of winners (boys) until 2004. List of medallists courtesy of Eduardo Biscayart.
List of winners (girls) until 2004. List of medallists courtesy of Eduardo Biscayart.
World Junior Athletics History ("WJAH")

 
Continental athletics championships
Under-18 athletics competitions
Athletics youth
Recurring sporting events established in 1973
U18
Biennial athletics competitions
South American youth sports competitions